Tom Johnson (born November 18, 1985, in Vancouver, British Columbia), is a professional lacrosse forward for the Edmonton Rush of the National Lacrosse League and the Burnaby Lakers of the Western Lacrosse Association (WLA).

NLL career 
Johnson was elected in the first round (seventh overall) in the 2007 National Lacrosse League entry draft out of Bellarmine University.

2008 Season: Johnson played in eight regular season games in his rookie season scoring eight goals and adding seven assists for 15 points. He was named NLL Rookie of the Week for his five-point performance (two goals, three assists) in a 14–6 win over Edmonton on April 11. He scored a goal and added an assist against Portland in the first round of the playoffs.

2009 Season: He scored two goals and one assist in the season opening 12–10 loss to the Calgary Roughnecks on January 9.

WLA career 
Johnson currently plays for the Maple Ridge Burrards of the WLA in the summer after being released from the Langley Thunder. He was awarded the Ed Bayley Trophy as the 2007 WLA Rookie of the Year in 2007 after scoring 27 goals and 27 assists for 54 points. Johnson was the Thunder's first round WLA draft pick out of the Junior A lacrosse Delta Islanders where he holds the all-time scoring record.

Statistics

NLL

References

1985 births
Living people
Bellarmine Knights men's lacrosse players
Canadian lacrosse players
Edmonton Rush players
San Jose Stealth players
Sportspeople from Vancouver
UBC Thunderbirds football players
University of British Columbia alumni
Washington Stealth players